"Skinflowers" is a single by The Young Gods appearing on their 1992 album T.V. Sky. It later appeared on the soundtrack of the 1993 film Sliver.

Cover versions
Faith No More, who has cited The Young Gods as an influence, has performed the song live a few times.

Accolades

Track listing
 "Skinflowers (Edited Version)" - 4:04
 "Skinflowers (Brain Forest Mix (The Orb Style))" - 7:26
 "Skinflowers (Courtney Speed Love Mix)" - 3:53
 "Skinflowers (Album Version)" (5:08)

Footnotes

The Young Gods songs
1991 singles